In mathematical analysis, an improper integral is the limit of a definite integral as an endpoint of the interval(s) of integration approaches either a specified real number or positive or negative infinity; or in some instances as both endpoints approach limits. Such an integral is often written symbolically just like a standard definite integral, in some cases with infinity as a limit of integration.

Specifically, an improper integral is a limit of the form:

or

in which one takes a limit in one or the other (or sometimes both) endpoints .

By abuse of notation, improper integrals are often written symbolically just like standard definite integrals, perhaps with infinity among the limits of integration. When the definite integral exists (in the sense of either the Riemann integral or the more powerful Lebesgue integral), this ambiguity is resolved as both the proper and improper integral will coincide in value.

Often one is able to compute values for improper integrals, even when the function is not integrable in the conventional sense (as a Riemann integral, for instance) because of a singularity in the function or because one of the bounds of integration is infinite.

Examples
However, the Riemann integral can often be extended by continuity, by defining the improper integral instead as a limit

The narrow definition of the Riemann integral also does not cover the function  on the interval . The problem here is that the integrand is unbounded in the domain of integration (the definition requires that both the domain of integration and the integrand be bounded). However, the improper integral does exist if understood as the limit

Sometimes integrals may have two singularities where they are improper. Thus this is a doubly improper integral. Integrated, say, from 1 to 3, an ordinary Riemann sum suffices to produce a result of /6. However, any finite upper bound, say  (with ), gives a well-defined result, . This has a finite limit as  goes to infinity, namely /2. Similarly, the integral from 1/3 to 1 allows a Riemann sum as well, coincidentally again producing /6. Replacing 1/3 by an arbitrary positive value  (with ) is equally safe, giving . This, too, has a finite limit as  goes to zero, namely /2. Combining the limits of the two fragments, the result of this improper integral is

This process does not guarantee success; a limit might fail to exist, or might be infinite. For example, over the bounded interval from 0 to 1 the integral of  does not converge; and over the unbounded interval from 1 to  the integral of  does not converge.

It might also happen that an integrand is unbounded near an interior point, in which case the integral must be split at that point. For the integral as a whole to converge, the limit integrals on both sides must exist and must be bounded. For example:

But the similar integral

cannot be assigned a value in this way, as the integrals above and below zero do not independently converge. (However, see Cauchy principal value.)

Convergence of the integral 
An improper integral converges if the limit defining it exists.  Thus for example one says that the improper integral

exists and is equal to L if the integrals under the limit exist for all sufficiently large t, and the value of the limit is equal to L.

It is also possible for an improper integral to diverge to infinity.  In that case, one may assign the value of ∞ (or −∞) to the integral. For instance 

However, other improper integrals may simply diverge in no particular direction, such as

which does not exist, even as an extended real number. This is called divergence by oscillation.

A limitation of the technique of improper integration is that the limit must be taken with respect to one endpoint at a time.  Thus, for instance, an improper integral of the form

can be defined by taking two separate limits; to wit

provided the double limit is finite. It can also be defined as a pair of distinct improper integrals of the first kind:

where c is any convenient point at which to start the integration. This definition also applies when one of these integrals is infinite, or both if they have the same sign.

An example of an improper integral where both endpoints are infinite is the Gaussian integral  An example which evaluates to infinity is  But one cannot even define other integrals of this kind unambiguously, such as  since the double limit is infinite and the two-integral method

yields an indeterminate form,  In this case, one can however define an improper integral in the sense of Cauchy principal value:

The questions one must address in determining an improper integral are:

Does the limit exist?
Can the limit be computed?

The first question is an issue of mathematical analysis. The second one can be addressed by calculus techniques, but also in some cases by contour integration, Fourier transforms and other more advanced methods.

Types of integrals
There is more than one theory of integration. From the point of view of calculus, the Riemann integral theory is usually assumed as the default theory. In using improper integrals, it can matter which integration theory is in play.

 For the Riemann integral (or the Darboux integral, which is equivalent to it), improper integration is necessary both for unbounded intervals (since one cannot divide the interval into finitely many subintervals of finite length) and for unbounded functions with finite integral (since, supposing it is unbounded above, then the upper integral will be infinite, but the lower integral will be finite).
The Lebesgue theory does not see this as a deficiency: from the point of view of measure theory,  and cannot be defined satisfactorily. In some situations, however, it may be convenient to employ improper Lebesgue integrals as is the case, for instance, when defining the Cauchy principal value. The Lebesgue integral is more or less essential in the theoretical treatment of the Fourier transform, with pervasive use of integrals over the whole real line.
 For the Henstock–Kurzweil integral, improper integration is not necessary, and this is seen as a strength of the theory: it encompasses all Lebesgue integrable and improper Riemann integrable functions.

Improper Riemann integrals and Lebesgue integrals 

In some cases, the integral

can be defined as an integral (a Lebesgue integral, for instance) without reference to the limit

but cannot otherwise be conveniently computed.  This often happens when the function f being integrated from a to c has a vertical asymptote at c, or if c = ∞ (see Figures 1 and 2).  In such cases, the improper Riemann integral allows one to calculate the Lebesgue integral of the function.  Specifically, the following theorem holds  :

 If a function f is Riemann integrable on [a,b] for every b ≥ a, and the partial integrals

are bounded as b → ∞, then the improper Riemann integrals

both exist.  Furthermore, f is Lebesgue integrable on [a, ∞), and its Lebesgue integral is equal to its improper Riemann integral.

For example, the integral

can be interpreted alternatively as the improper integral

or it may be interpreted instead as a Lebesgue integral over the set (0, ∞).  Since both of these kinds of integral agree, one is free to choose the first method to calculate the value of the integral, even if one ultimately wishes to regard it as a Lebesgue integral.  Thus improper integrals are clearly useful tools for obtaining the actual values of integrals.

In other cases, however, a Lebesgue integral between finite endpoints may not even be defined, because the integrals of the positive and negative parts of f are both infinite, but the improper Riemann integral may still exist.  Such cases are "properly improper" integrals, i.e. their values cannot be defined except as such limits.  For example,

cannot be interpreted as a Lebesgue integral, since

But  is nevertheless integrable between any two finite endpoints, and its integral between 0 and ∞ is usually understood as the limit of the integral:

Singularities
One can speak of the singularities of an improper integral, meaning those points of the extended real number line at which limits are used.

Cauchy principal value

Consider the difference in values of two limits:

The former is the Cauchy principal value of the otherwise ill-defined expression

Similarly, we have

but

The former is the principal value of the otherwise ill-defined expression

All of the above limits are cases of the indeterminate form ∞ − ∞.

These pathologies do not affect "Lebesgue-integrable" functions, that is, functions the integrals of whose absolute values are finite.

Summability
An improper integral may diverge in the sense that the limit defining it may not exist.  In this case, there are more sophisticated definitions of the limit which can produce a convergent value for the improper integral.  These are called summability methods.

One summability method, popular in Fourier analysis, is that of Cesàro summation.  The integral

is Cesàro summable (C, α) if

exists and is finite .  The value of this limit, should it exist, is the (C, α) sum of the integral.

An integral is (C, 0) summable precisely when it exists as an improper integral.  However, there are integrals which are (C, α) summable for α > 0 which fail to converge as improper integrals (in the sense of Riemann or Lebesgue). One example is the integral

which fails to exist as an improper integral, but is (C,α) summable for every α > 0.  This is an integral version of Grandi's series.

Multivariable improper integrals
The improper integral can also be defined for functions of several variables.

Improper integrals over arbitrary domains

provided it exists.

The Riemann integral of a function over a bounded domain A is then defined as the integral of the extended function  over a cube  containing A:  

Improper integrals with singularities
If f is a non-negative function which is unbounded in a domain A, then the improper integral of f is defined by truncating f at some cutoff M, integrating the resulting function, and then taking the limit as M tends to infinity. Then define

provided this limit exists.

Functions with both positive and negative values
These definitions apply for functions that are non-negative.  A more general function f can be decomposed as a difference of its positive part  and negative part , so

In order to exist in this sense, the improper integral necessarily converges absolutely, since

Notes

Bibliography
 .
 .

 .

External links
 Numerical Methods to Solve Improper Integrals at Holistic Numerical Methods Institute

Integral calculus